Pecci may refer to:

People
Eraldo Pecci (born 1955), Italian footballer
Giuseppe Pecci (1807–1890), theologian and Roman Catholic Cardinal
Víctor Pecci (born 1955), Paraguayan tennis player.
Pope Leo XIII (1810–1903), born Count Vincenzo Gioacchino Raffaele Luigi Pecci, Pope of the Roman Catholic Church (from 1878 to 1903)

Places
Centro per l'arte contemporanea Luigi Pecci (Centre for Contemporary Art Luigi Pecci), Prato near Florence, Italy